Collapsing can or can crusher experiment is a demonstration of an aluminum can being crushed by atmospheric pressure. Due to the low pressure inside a can as compared to the pressure outside, the pressure outside exerts a force on the can causing the can to collapse.

Explanation 

The demonstration starts with boiling water inside the can. As the water is boiled, water vapor is created and filled the space inside the can which pushing air inside out. 

H2O → H2O

Then, inverting a water vapor-filled can into a water bath causing water vapor to rapidly condense back to water. The condensation of water reduces pressure inside the can, so the higher pressure outside the can make the can collapse.

H2O → H2O

Limitation 

There will be an impeding event that could occur which is water in the water bath being drawn inside the can by the reduced pressure. As a result, in a basic demonstration, only an aluminum can is able to be used since it is not very strong. Unlike other stronger can such as steel can, the aluminum can will be collapsed before the water can be drawn inside the can. Nevertheless, Professor Julius Sumner Miller could make a steel drum collapse by sealing the opening of the drum after the water inside the drum boils and pouring water and ice onto the drum surface.

Alternatives 
Addition of sodium hydroxide to a can filled with carbon dioxide can produce a similar result.

Gallery

Reference 

Physics education
Chemistry classroom experiments
Articles containing video clips

External links 
 Can Crush Demonstration